Hold Everything is a 1930 American Pre-Code film. It was the first musical comedy film to be released that was photographed entirely in early two-color Technicolor. It was adapted from the DeSylva-Brown-Henderson Broadway musical of the same name that had served as a vehicle for Bert Lahr and starred Winnie Lightner and Joe E. Brown as the comedy duo. The romantic subplot was played by Georges Carpentier and Sally O'Neil. Only three songs from the stage show remained: "You're the Cream in My Coffee", "To Know You Is To Love You", and "Don't Hold Everything". New songs were written for the film by Al Dubin and Joe Burke, including one that became a hit in 1930: "When The Little Red Roses Get The Blues For You". The songs in the film were played by Abe Lyman and his orchestra.

Plot
Brown plays Gink Schiner, a third-rate fighter who is at the same training camp as Georges La Verne (played by Georges Carpentier), a contender for the heavyweight championship. Although he needs to be concentrating all of his energies on the upcoming bout, Georges keeps getting distracted: Norine Lloyd, a society dame, has a distinct interest in him, but the interest is strictly one-sided. Georges prefers Sue, an old buddy and confidante. Gink has woman trouble of his own, as his flirtations do not sit at all well with Toots (played by Winnie Lightner), his erstwhile girlfriend. More trouble arrives when Larkin, manager of current heavyweight champ Bob Morgan, appears at the camp with the goal of fixing the fight. He is sent packing, after which he attempts to slip a Mickey Finn to the challenger—a plan which goes awry when Gink switches the drinks. Meanwhile, Gink, who is fighting in a preliminary in advance of the big fight, actually wins. Things don't look so bright for Georges, who initially gets the worst of it in his encounter with Morgan, but who eventually comes out on top.

Cast
Joe E. Brown as Gink Schiner
Winnie Lightner as Toots Breen
Sally O'Neil as Sue Burke
Georges Carpentier as Georges La Verne
Edmund Breese as Pop O'Keefe
Bert Roach as Nosey Bartlett
Dorothy Revier as Norine Lloyd
Jack Curtis as Murph Levy
Tony Stabenau as Bob Morgan
Lew Harvey as Dan Larkin
Abe Lyman as Orchestra Leader

Release

In 1930, this was the first film shown at the newly opened Warner Bros. Hollywood Theatre, a luxurious New York City movie palace specifically designed to showcase its then-revolutionary Vitaphone sound films. The theatre later became a legitimate Broadway venue, the Mark Hellinger Theatre, and is now the home of the Times Square Church.

Box office
According to Warner Bros records the film earned $1,018,000 domestically and $315,000 foreign.

Preservation status
The sound discs survive, but the visuals are lost. The George Eastman Museum 2015 book The Dawn of Technicolor, 1915-1935 mistakenly reported that the Library of Congress possesses a black and white print, but that is not true. No Color print is known to exist as of 2021 .

See also
 List of early color feature films
 List of early Warner Bros. talking features

References

External links

1930 films
1930s color films
1930s sports comedy films
American boxing films
Warner Bros. films
1930s English-language films
Films directed by Roy Del Ruth
1930s rediscovered films
American musical comedy films
1930 musical comedy films
Early color films
Films with screenplays by Robert Lord (screenwriter)
American sports comedy films
Rediscovered American films
1930s American films